The 3rd constituency of the Savoie (French: Troisième circonscription de la Savoie) is a French legislative constituency in the Savoie département. Like the other 576 French constituencies, it elects one MP using a two round electoral system.

Description

The 3rd constituency of Savoie covers the southern edge of the department along the border of France and Italy.

The constituency has fluctuated between centre left and conservative deputies. Boundary changes prior to the 2012 have substantially altered the seat, removing the parts of Chambéry it had previously contained.

Assembly Members

Election results

2022 

 
 
|-
| colspan="8" bgcolor="#E9E9E9"|
|-

2017 

 
 
 
 
 
 
 
 
|-
| colspan="8" bgcolor="#E9E9E9"|
|-

2012

 
 
 
 
 
|-
| colspan="8" bgcolor="#E9E9E9"|
|-

References

3